Mollah Maqbool Hossain is a Bangladeshi politician. He is a member of the Bangladesh Nationalist Party. He was elected a member of parliament from Jessore-14 in 1979 Bangladeshi general election.

Career 
Mollah Maqbool Hossain was elected a Member of Parliament from Jessore-14 constituency as an Bangladesh Nationalist Party candidate in the 1979 Bangladeshi general election.

References 

Living people
Year of birth missing (living people)
Bangladesh Nationalist Party politicians
2nd Jatiya Sangsad members